Charles "Carl" Diebold (October 24, 1824 – March 5, 1894) was a German-American industrialist who was the founder of Diebold. Carl Diebold was also a safe maker and a locksmith.

Life
Charles Diebold (Carl "Charles" Diebold) was born in Rosenberg, Bavaria, Germany on October 24, 1824, to Bernhardt Diebold and Mary Diebold. Nothing is known about his early life or his education.

At the 1893 fourth of July Celebration at Meyer's Lake Canton, Ohio Carl entered his Mule "Dick" into a race and finished in third place.

Diebold
Diebold founded Diebold Bahmann in 1859 as a manufacturer of safes and vaults in Cincinnati, Ohio. Charles gave his company a good reputation after The Great Chicago Fire in 1871 which leveled most of the city. Rumors went about that the 878 safes in the area had the items in them intact. In 1872, needing more room for his expanding company, moved to Canton, Ohio, where most of the post-fire orders were from. Two years later, in 1874, Wells Fargo asked Diebold to make the world's largest vault at the time: a 32-foot-long, 27-foot-wide, 12-foot high vault that was moved to San Francisco on a 47 car long train. In 1876 Diebold was incorporated by The State of Ohio as Diebold Safe & Lock Co. Its first international shipment in Diebold's lifetime was to the President of Mexico, Manuel González Flores in 1881. The final major event for the company in his lifetime was the introduction of magnesium steel doors which were billed as TNT-proof which was becoming a new way for thieves to break into banks.

Positions at Diebold

Death 
Carl Diebold died on March 5, 1894, in North Canton, Ohio, after having a stroke and being paralyzed.

References

1824 births
1894 deaths
Businesspeople from Ohio
Gilded Age
German emigrants to the United States
American industrialists
People from Amberg-Sulzbach
People from Stark County, Ohio